Keeva Fennelly (born 1987) is a camogie player and financial reporter. She played in the 2009 All Ireland camogie final.

Career
She won an All-Ireland Junior medal in 2002 and a National League medal in 2008. She was the 2009 Waterford IT Ashbourne Cup and league-winning captain.

Family background
Keeva's father Ger and uncles all gave distinguished service to Kilkenny. She has two first cousins, Leann Fennelly and Kelly Ann Cotterell, on the 2009 All Ireland panel, while another cousin, Michael Fennelly, captained the Kilkenny hurlers in 2009.

References

External links 
 Official Camogie Website
 Kilkenny Camogie Website
 of 2009 championship in On The Ball Official Camogie Magazine
 https://web.archive.org/web/20091228032101/http://www.rte.ie/sport/gaa/championship/gaa_fixtures_camogie_oduffycup.html Fixtures and results] for the 2009 O'Duffy Cup
 All-Ireland Senior Camogie Championship: Roll of Honour
 Video highlights of 2009 championship Part One and part two
 Video Highlights of 2009 All Ireland Senior Final
 Report of All Ireland final in Irish Times Independent and Examiner

1987 births
Living people
Kilkenny camogie players
Waterford IT camogie players